The Mikser Festival is an annual exhibition promoting design, architecture, urban planning, new technologies, art, music, and communications in Serbia. It was founded in 2006 by architect Maja Vidaković Lalić. It invites international and local experts from creative industries. It features lectures, competitions, workshops, exhibits, concerts, films and theater plays.

The festival occurs once a year in Belgrade at the end of May or the beginning of June, and usually lasts 4 to 7 days. The first one was held at the "Žitomlina" silo in the Dorćol area of Belgrade. It was subsequently held in Belgrade's once-derelict industrial zone of Savamala to help revitalize that area, before returning to Dorćol in 2017. 

Its 2010 attendance of 40,000 grew to 75,000 in 2017. 

The festival is part of the Mikser umbrella organization, which includes the Mikser House, a gallery and cultural space in the Savamala neighborhood.  The group also operates the reMiks Studio, Mikser TV, the Mikser Organization, the Miksalište Refugee Center, the Mikser Café and the Balkan Design store. 

The Mikser Festival sometimes coordinates with other events. In 2006, its Ghost Project exhibit appeared at Belgrade Design Week. The multimedia installation initially focused on local unrealized projects in industrial design; and since 2011, it has evolved into a competition for international designers.

Highlights
The main theme of the 2011 festival was the promotion of workshops, new technologies, and experimentation, as well as commemorating the 20 year anniversary of the break-up of Yugoslavia. Musicians who had been popular before the break-up were invited to perform. Greg Wilson, John Tejada, JD Twitch and JG Wilkes, from the British club scene, also made appearances. In 2011, Lalić launched The Young Balkan Designers competition as part of the Mikser Festival. Aimed at local industrial designers, the first competition was judged by designer Konstantin Grcic and Maja Vidaković Lalić. Winners had their work shown at design events such as the Milan Furniture Fair and Vienna Design Week.

In 2014, the Misker Festival focused on the Savamala neighbourhood, in a bid to continue its revitalization. 40 urban planners from around the world were invited to discuss possibilities for renewal.  Austrian choreographer William Dorner performed a dance recital with the goal of inspiring local residents to protect their city. Three Swiss artists exhibited a multimedia installation featuring video footage of Savamala and other urban neighborhoods. A conference and workshops were also held with Dutch designer Renne Ramakers and British architect Jeremy Till in attendance.

The 2017 festival concentrated on the themes of migration, education on the move, the city, and the making of culture. The topics were addressed through design, the visual arts, cinema and music, as well as the lecture series "Mikser Talks". About 50 local and international experts spoke about the planning of cities, architecture, design, social sciences, information technologies, and communications. Representatives from the Imperial College in London gave a presentation about sustainable urban planning.  Additionally, the festival hosted a bazaar with home-made clothes and food stands,  and also invited the gaming company Nordeus, which organized workshops for Serbian youth.  Concerts were given by musicians Aleksandar Sedlar Bogoev, Marko Luis and the Lola Klasik String Orchestra, among others. New in 2017, was a creative camp aimed at solving social problems through technology.

See also
 Belgrade Design Week
 Maja Vidaković Lalić

References

External links
 http://festival.mikser.rs
International conferences
Events in Belgrade
Industrial design awards
Festivals in Serbia
Serbian designers
Design events
June events
May events
Spring (season) events
Annual events in Serbia
Spring (season) events in Serbia